Development Today is an independent magazine on Nordic and multilateral aid, published fortnightly since 1991. Founded by a group of Nordic journalists, Development Today has a policy of not accepting funding from donors, NGOs, or other aid actors. It is based in Asker, Norway. Development Today claims to be the only specialised aid publication with this strict editorial line. The magazine is published 20 times a year and is financed exclusively through subscriptions and advertising.

References

External links
 

English-language magazines
Biweekly magazines
Magazines established in 1991
Magazines published in Norway
1991 establishments in Norway